Mountains is an image analysis and surface metrology software platform published by the company Digital Surf. Its core is micro-topography, the science of studying surface texture and form in 3D at the microscopic scale. The software is dedicated to profilometers, 3D light microscopes ("MountainsMap"), scanning electron microscopes ("MountainsSEM") and scanning probe microscopes ("MountainsSPIP").

Integration by instrument manufacturers
The main editor's distribution channel is OEM, through the integration of MountainsMap by most profiler and microscope manufacturers, usually under their respective brands; it is sold for instance as:
 Hitachi map 3D on Hitachi's scanning electron microscopes,
 TopoMAPS on Thermo Fisher Scientific (FEI division) scanning electron microscopes,
 TalyMap, TalyProfile, or TalyMap Contour on Taylor-Hobson's profilometers,
 PicoImage on Keysight's AFM's,
 HommelMap on Jenoptik's profilometers (Hommel-Etamic line of products),
 MountainsMap - X on Nikon's microscopes,
 Apex 2D or Apex 3D on KLA-Tencor's profilometers,
 Leica Map on Leica's microscopes,
 ConfoMap on Carl Zeiss' microscopes,
 MCubeMap on Mitutoyo profilometers.
 Vision 64 Map on Bruker optical profilometers
 AttoMap on cathodoluminescence-analysis-dedicated scanning electron microscopes from AttoLight
 SmileView Map on JEOL's scanning electron microscopes,
 SensoMap on Sensofar's optical profilometers,

Compatibility
 Mountains native file format is the SURF format (.SUR extension).
 Mountains is compatible with most instruments of the market capable of supplying images or topography.
 Mountains complies to the ISO 25178 standard on 3D surface texture evaluation and offers the profile and areal filters defined in ISO 16610.
 The metrology reports are generated in proprietary format but can also be exported to PDF and RTF formats.
 Mountains is available in English, Brazilian Portuguese, simplified Chinese, French, German, Italian, Japanese, Korean, Polish, Russian and  Spanish.

Data types ("studiables") accepted

Vocabulary: 
In Mountains's vocabulary, these data types are referred to as "studiables".

Most studiables have a dynamic (time-series) equivalent, e.g., the surface studiable  used to study topography has an associate studiable Series of Surfaces  used to study the evolution of topography (e.g., heat distortion of a surface).

Mountains analyses the following basic data types:

History of versions
Digital Surf launched their first (2D) surface analysis software package in 1990 for MS-DOS ("DigiProfil 1.0"), then their first 3D surface analysis package in 1991 for Macintosh II ("DigiSurface 1.0").
 Version 1.0 of MountainsMap was launched in September 1996, introducing a change in the name after a move of the editor to Windows from MsDos and Macintosh platforms.
 Version 5.0 introduced the management of multi-layers images. It was a move to Confocal microscopy (analysis of topography+color as a single object as opposed to separate objects in former versions), and to SPM image analysis (analysis of topography+current, topography+phase, topography+force as a single image).

 Version 6.0 completed the specialization of the platform per instrument type. For Version 6.0 the company teamed with a group of alpinists to launch the new version at the summit of the Makalu mountain. A special logo was created for this marketing event. The expedition was successful and Alexia Zuberer, a French and Swiss mountaineer was then the first Swiss woman to reach the summit of the Makalu, Sandrine de Choudens, a French PhD in chemistry being the first French woman to succeed
 Version 7.0 was unveiled in September 2012 at the European Microscopy Congress in Manchester, UK. It expanded the list of instruments supported, in particular with new Scanning electron microscope 3D reconstruction software and hyperspectral data analysis (such as Raman and FT-IR hyperspectral cube analysis).
 Version 7.2 (February 2015) introduces near real-time 3D topography reconstruction for scanning electron microscopes
 Version 7.3 (January 2016) adds fast colorization of scanning electron microscope images based on object-oriented image segmentation.
 Version 7.4 (January 2017) offers 3D reconstruction from a single SEM image, and enhanced 3D printing 
 Version 8.0 (June 2019) is the successor of both Mountains 7.4 and SPIP 6.7 software packages ("SPIP" standing for "Scanning Probe Image Processor") after the acquisition by Digital Surf of the Danish company Image Metrology A/S, the editor of SPIP. Version 8.0 also introduces the analysis of free form surfaces, called "Shells" in the software.
 Version 9.0 (June 2021)completes the "shells" (free form surfaces) with surface texture analysis adapted from the ISO 25178 parameters already calculated on the standard surfaces. It also comes with a new product line, "MountainsSpectral", dedicated to the chemical mapping of elements in both 2D (images of chemical composition) and 3D (multi-channel tomography of chemical composition), with applications such as FIB-SEM EDX (X-Ray analysis coupled with focused ion beam tomography) or confocal Raman (Raman analysis in confocal microscopy)

Instruments supported

References

External links
 New 3D parameters and filtration techniques for surface metrology, François Blateyron, Quality Magazine White Paper
 Manufacturer's official Web site
 Makalu 2010 expedition sum up published by one of the Mountaineers, Philippe Bourgine
 Makalu 2010 expedition video

1996 software
Data analysis software
Science software
Science software for Windows
Windows graphics-related software
Image processing software